Laban-e Sofla (also Romanized as Labān-e Soflá; also known as Labān and Lavān-e Pā’īn) is a village in Silakhor Rural District, Silakhor District, Dorud County, Lorestan Province, Iran. At the 2006 census, its population was 176, in 43 families.

References 

Towns and villages in Dorud County